Ricardo Inokuchi is a Brazilian table tennis player.

References

 

Year of birth missing (living people)
Living people
Brazilian male table tennis players
Brazilian people of Japanese descent
Pan American Games medalists in table tennis
Pan American Games gold medalists for Brazil
Pan American Games silver medalists for Brazil
Table tennis players at the 1983 Pan American Games
Medalists at the 1983 Pan American Games
20th-century Brazilian people